George Washington De Long (22 August 1844 – ) was a United States Navy officer and explorer who led the ill-fated Jeannette expedition of 1879–1881, in search of the Open Polar Sea.

Career

Jeannette expedition 

In 1879, backed by James Gordon Bennett Jr.—owner of the New York Herald—and under the auspices of the United States Navy, Lieutenant Commander De Long sailed from San Francisco on the ship  with a plan to find a way to the North Pole via the Bering Strait. As well as collecting scientific data and animal specimens, De Long discovered three islands and claimed them for the United States in the summer of 1881. The government did not endorse this claim, and the islands are under Russian jurisdiction.

The ship became trapped in the ice pack in the Chukchi Sea northeast of Wrangel Island in September 1879. De Long and his crew then traversed the ice pack to try to reach Siberia pulling three small boats.

After reaching open water on September 11 they became separated and one boat, commanded by Executive Officer Charles W. Chipp, was lost; no trace of it was ever found. De Long's own boat reached land, but only two men sent ahead for aid survived. The third boat, under the command of Chief Engineer George W. Melville, reached the Lena Delta and its crew were rescued. Melville later found and brought to the U.S. the ships log books which now sit in the U.S. National Archives.

Death 
De Long died of starvation near Matvay Hut, Yakutia. Melville returned a few months later and found the bodies of De Long and his boat crew. Overall, the doomed voyage took the lives of 20 expedition members, as well as additional men lost during the search operations. De Long's death – and that of the other men – was assumed to have occurred at or about the end of October. By direction of the United States government, the remains of De Long and his companions were brought home and interred with honour in his native city.

Legacy 
In 1890, the officers and men of the United States Navy dedicated the Jeannette Monument, a granite-and-marble monument designed by George P. Colvocoresses—a cross with carved icicles hanging from it that sits atop a cairn. The -high structure is in the United States Naval Academy Cemetery overlooking the Severn River.

His journal, in which he made regular entries up to the day on which he died, was edited by his wife and published in 1883 under the title Voyage of the "Jeannette", and an account of the search which was made for him and his comrades by Melville was published a year later under the title of In the Lena Delta.

Union veterans in the Kingdom of Hawai‘i on September 23, 1882, named the post of the Grand Army of the Republic there after him.

Two United States Navy ships have been named  after George W. De Long. In addition to the De Long Islands, the De Long Mountains in northwest Alaska, and the De Long Fjord in Greenland bear his name.

References

Notes

Footnotes

Bibliography

External links 

 
 
 
 

19th-century American naval officers
1844 births
1881 deaths
American polar explorers
Burials at Woodlawn Cemetery (Bronx, New York)
Deaths by starvation
Explorers of the Arctic
Jeannette expedition
Military personnel from New York City
Shipwreck survivors
United States Naval Academy alumni
United States Navy officers